NSEL may refer to:
 NSEL (networking), part of a Network Service Access Point address used in Open Systems Interconnection networking
 National Spot Exchange, a commodities exchange in India
 NSEL case, a legal investigation
 Newmark Structural Engineering Laboratory, University of Illinois at Urbana-Champaign

See also
 NSL (disambiguation)